Night Beat is a 1947 British Brit-noir, crime thriller drama film directed by Harold Huth and starring Anne Crawford, Maxwell Reed, Ronald Howard, Hector Ross, Christine Norden and Sid James. Following the Second World War, the two comrades go their separate ways; one joins the Metropolitan Police while the other begins a police career but becomes a racketeer in post-war London. Sky Movies described the film as a "British thriller that examines a challenging issue of its times: the problems encountered by servicemen when trying to adjust to civilian life."

Cast
Anne Crawford as Julie Kendall
Maxwell Reed as Felix Fenton
Ronald Howard as Andy Kendall
Christine Norden as Jackie
Hector Ross as Don Brady
Fred Groves as PC Kendall
Sid James as Nixon (as Sidney James)
Nicholas Stuart as Rocky
Frederick Leister as Magistrate
Michael Medwin as  Spider
 Robert Cawdron as Police recruit
Robert Raglan as Detective Sergeant (uncredited)

Critical reception
The Radio Times wrote, "a relishably bad British crime drama set in an unreal Soho underworld of spivs and nightclubs. It's a compendium of clichés...Benjamin Frankel's score is better than the film deserves." Allmovie wrote, "though its starts out strong, Night Beat metamorphoses into standard melodramatics towards the end." Britmovie wrote, "fast-paced British crime melodrama...The two lead actors are particularly wooden and it’s left to the supporting cast to add some lowlife colour; particularly Maxwell Reed’s smug villain, Christine Norden as the vampish blonde, Sid James piano playing snout and a brief appearance by Michael Medwin as an indignant petty crook."

References

External links
 

1947 films
1940s crime drama films
British black-and-white films
British crime drama films
British Lion Films films
Films directed by Harold Huth
Films scored by Benjamin Frankel
Films set in London
1947 drama films
1948 drama films
1948 films
1940s English-language films
1940s British films